Eli Bradley (14 October 1883 – 1964) was an English footballer who played in the Football League for West Bromwich Albion.

References

1883 births
1964 deaths
English footballers
Association football forwards
English Football League players
Dudley Town F.C. players
West Bromwich Albion F.C. players
Luton Town F.C. players
Coventry City F.C. players
Heart of Midlothian F.C. players